Valentine's Day Soundtrack is the official soundtrack to the 2010 film Valentine's Day, released on February 9, 2010 via Big Machine Records. The album includes contributions from country and pop artists, including Big Machine artists Taylor Swift, Jewel and Steel Magnolia.

Content
"Keep On Lovin' You" was recorded by Steel Magnolia, the second-season winners of the talent show Can You Duet, on its self-titled debut extended play. The song has reached Top 10 on the Billboard country charts.

Taylor Swift has two cuts: "Jump Then Fall" (from the Platinum Edition (2009) of her second studio album Fearless (2008)) and "Today Was a Fairytale," both of which had previously been released as digital singles. Jewel's "Stay Here Forever" was also released to country radio in advance of the album's release.

Critical reception
Jessica Phillips of Country Weekly gave the soundtrack three stars out of five, saying that "no sound track about love is complete without country music" and praising the cuts by Swift, Jewel and Steel Magnolia, but adding that it "could have mined a little deeper into country music's rich vault."

Track list

Chart performance

References

2010s film soundtrack albums
2010 soundtrack albums
WaterTower Music soundtracks
Big Machine Records soundtracks
Albums produced by Taylor Swift
Albums produced by Nathan Chapman (record producer)
Albums produced by Dann Huff